Paul Colin (1895, in Saint-Josse-ten-Noode – 8 April 1943, in Brussels) was a Belgian journalist, famous as the leading journalist and editor of the Rexist collaborationist newspapers "Le Nouveau Journal" and "Cassandre".

Biography
His father was an important businessman who died when Colin was two. In 1914, Colin started university studies in History and Art History, but had to interrupt them because of the First World War. After the war, he became a journalist and art critic, and then the manager of the Giroux art gallery, located on the avenue des Arts in Brussels. He wrote a number of books on painting, on Belgian and European painting, Romanticism and Édouard Manet.

1930s
In the 1930s, Colin became fascinated by extreme-right movements, both fascism and nazism. In September 1939, Colin, along with Robert Poulet, Pierre Daye and ten other journalists (most of them fascists, but including some left-wing pacifists) signed a pro-German manifesto calling for Belgian neutrality in the war. This manifesto has often been claimed to be the starting-point of French-speaking journalistic collaboration in Belgium, though another version claims Paul-Henri Spaak, a socialist minister at the time, was the secret sponsor of the manifesto.

1940s

In 1940, after Belgium was occupied by Nazi Germany, Colin founded the Nazi propaganda newspaper Le Nouveau Journal. The first edition appeared on 1 October of that year. One of Colin's associates, Robert Poulet, had in the meantime secretly met King Leopold III's private secretary, Count Capelle, and obtained a tentative royal approval for the project.

However, as the war dragged on, German victory became less certain and food rations decreased, more and more Belgians joined the ranks of those who criticized the "New Order". In 1943, various members of the Belgian Resistance, led by Marcel Demonceau, hatched the plan to kill both Colin and the Rexist leader Léon Degrelle. Colin was shot dead by a member of this Resistance group, 19-year-old Arnaud Fraiteur. The attempt on the life of Degrelle failed because Demonceau was arrested at his hiding-place in Ixelles together with many associates, British airmen and members of the Belgian London-based Intelligence Service.

It later transpired that the group had been infiltrated by a Belgian collaborator posing as "Captain Jackson", who claimed to be a Canadian airman; the infiltrator's real name was Prosper Dezitter. He might have helped plan the slaying of Colin in order to gain Demonceau's confidence and thus net as many Resistance and other people in hiding as possible. Fraiteur, Demonceau and many fellow members of the Resistance were later executed by the Germans at Breendonk. After the war, Dezitter was arrested in Germany, extradited, condemned to death, and shot by a firing squad at Ixelles on 17 September 1948.

See also
History of Belgium
Rexism

Bibliography
"La peinture belge depuis 1830." Brussels, Editions des cahiers de Belgique,1930
"Édouard Manet", Paris, Floury, 1932
"La Peinture européenne au XIXieme siècle: le Romantisme", id., 1935.

External links
 How le Nouveau Journal was started. (in French)
 A book on Paul Colin. (in French)
 Prosper Dezitter, our own people in the Gestapo (in Dutch)

1895 births
1943 deaths
Male journalists
Belgian collaborators with Nazi Germany
People from Saint-Josse-ten-Noode
Assassinated Nazis
Belgian anti-communists
Belgian propagandists
Nazi propagandists
Deaths by firearm in Belgium
Assassinated Belgian people
People murdered in Belgium
20th-century Belgian journalists
Belgian magazine founders
Executed Belgian collaborators with Nazi Germany